Frédéric Palluel (born 15 December 1967) is a French former ice dancer. With Dominique Yvon, he is a two-time French national champion (1989, 1992). They finished 8th at the 1992 Winter Olympics and 7th at the 1992 World Championships.

Results 
With Yvon:

References

1967 births
Living people
French male ice dancers
Olympic figure skaters of France
Figure skaters at the 1992 Winter Olympics
Figure skaters from Paris